Orphans is a 1998 Scottish black comedy film written and directed by Peter Mullan and starring Douglas Henshall, Gary Lewis and Rosemarie Stevenson.

This was the first full-length film directed by Mullan, who later won a Best Actor award at Cannes for My Name is Joe, and who went on to direct The Magdalene Sisters and Neds. He has said that the film is not autobiographical, but that he wrote the film shortly after the death of his mother, and that each of the four main characters represent an element of what he was feeling at the time.

The film was funded by Channel 4 Films, the Scottish Arts Council National Lottery Fund, and the Glasgow Film Fund.

The soundtrack includes music by Craig Armstrong, and Billy Connolly singing Mairi's Wedding and two songs he wrote for the film.

Plot
On a grey day in Glasgow, Scotland, three brothers and their disabled sister meet to arrange their mother, Mrs Flynn's, funeral. After they go to a public house and an incident occurs which separates the four and causes one to go on the search for a gun and one to pass off their stab wound as a work injury. The eldest brother stays overnight at the church to prepare for the funeral as their sister's wheelchair breaks down in a dark alleyway, causing her to be stranded and alone, desperate for help. What occurs is a journey of virtue and sin for each of them that will prove to them how much they truly miss their mother.

Cast
Douglas Henshall as Michael Flynn
Gary Lewis as Thomas Flynn
Rosemarie Stevenson as Sheila Flynn
Stephen McCole as John Flynn
 Frank Gallagher as Tanga

Distribution and reception
Having funded production, Channel Four Films decided not to distribute the film as they did not think it would attract a large commercial audience. The film was first shown at the 1998 Venice Film Festival, out of the main competition, but gaining four awards for Mullan: the Cult Network Italia Prize, the Isvema Award, the Kodak Award and the Prix Pierrot. In 1998, it also won prizes at the Gijón International Film Festival, and the British Independent Film Awards. It won the Grand Prix at the 1999 Festival du Film de Paris and won Mullan the Best Newcomer award at the 2000 Evening Standard British Film Awards.

In interviews, Mullan has said that once Orphans started winning awards Channel Four apologised and asked if they could distribute it, an offer he refused.

In 2021, it was announced that the film had been adapted into a musical with the National Theatre of Scotland. It was adapted by Douglas Maxwell with original music written and composed by Roddy Hart and Tommy Reilly. The show starred Robert Florence, Reuben Joseph, Dylan Wood and Amy Conachan amongst others. The show opened at the SEC Armadillo in Glasgow in April 2022 to a very positive reception.

References

External links

1998 films
Scottish films
British black comedy films
Films set in Glasgow
Films directed by Peter Mullan
Films scored by Craig Armstrong (composer)
2000s English-language films
1990s English-language films
1990s British films
2000s British films